Serre di Rapolano is a frazione in the comune of Rapolano Terme in the province of Siena, Tuscany, Italy.

It is located on a hill midway between the valleys of the Sentino and Ombrone rivers.

References

Frazioni of Rapolano Terme